František Repka (born 9 January 1966) is a Slovak skier. He competed in the Nordic combined event at the 1988 Winter Olympics.

References

External links
 

1966 births
Living people
Slovak male Nordic combined skiers
Olympic Nordic combined skiers of Czechoslovakia
Nordic combined skiers at the 1988 Winter Olympics
Sportspeople from Poprad